Kilby - Foxton Canal is a  biological Site of Special Scientific Interest along the Grand Union Canal and its banks in  Leicestershire, between Kilby Bridge, south of Wigston, and Debdale Wharf, north of Foxton.

Nine species of pondweed have been recorded on the canal, two of which are nationally rare, and submerged plants include Nuttall's waterweed and yellow water-lily. Fleckney Tunnel has a long established colony of Daubenton's bats.

The canal towpath runs through the site.

References

Sites of Special Scientific Interest in Leicestershire